Nasusina vallis is a moth in the family Geometridae. It is found in the John Brown Canyon in Colorado. The habitat consists of an arid region with mesas and canyons.

The length of the forewings is 9–10 mm. The forewings are light smoky grey with numerous fine cross lines. The hindwings are slightly paler than the forewings. They are marked by several darker lines and bands. Adults are probably on wing from mid to late May.

Etymology
The species name is derived from Latin vallis (meaning valley) and refers to the habitat of the species.

References

Moths described in 2004
Eupitheciini